Microjet may refer to:

Aviation
Bede BD-5J, a series of small, single-seat homebuilt aircraft
Microjet 200, a small jet trainer aircraft built by Microjet SA
Microturbo, manufacturer of small turbojet engines
US Microjet LLC, an American manufacturer of very small turbine engines
SubSonex, a small homebuilt jet built by Sonex Aircraft
An early term for the type of aircraft now known as Very Light Jets

Other
MicroJet Technology Co. Ltd, a Taiwanese manufacturer of inkjet printing technology
A very small rocket fired by a type of hand-held firearm called the Gyrojet